Kring julgranen, also known as Nu så är det jul igen, jultomten myser, is a Christmas song written by Alice Tegnér, and originally published in 1899 in volume 5 of Sjung med oss, mamma!.

The song, which has three verses, describes nature and seasonal change in a Nordic agricultural society, but the song lyrics of the first and second verse have led to the song being associated with Christmas. Even the final verse refers to Christmas.

Publications
Sjung med oss, mamma! (volume 5), 1899
Nu ska vi sjunga, 1943, under the lines "Julsånger".

Recordings
An early recording was done by Margareta Schönström-Modéen in Stockholm in May 1926, and on the record "Rida ranka" in November that year. The song was also recorded by Glenmarks on the 1974 album Jul a la carte. and by Anita Lindblom on the 1975 Christmas album Jul med tradition. and by Peter Himmelstrand, also 1975, on a "Nu ska vi sjunga"-themed album.

The song has also been recorded in Spanish by Maria Llerena as "Ya es Navidad" on the 1988 album Chiquitico mio.

References

1899 songs
Swedish Christmas songs
Swedish-language songs
Anita Lindblom songs